The Moon Stallion is a British children's television serial made by the BBC in 1978 and written by Brian Hayles, who also authored its novelization.

The series stars Sarah Sutton as Diana Purwell, a young blind girl who becomes embroiled in mystical intrigue set around the Berkshire and Wiltshire countryside.

Plot

Set in the late Victorian era, the story tells of how the Purwell family travel to Wiltshire when the father (widowed at some point) is contacted by Sir George Mortenhurze, local squire and a former cavalry officer, to seek out historical evidence of King Arthur. Professor Purwell takes his two children, Diana and Paul, with him.

Arriving at the railway station they are collected by the squire's groom, 'Todman', and driven by pony and trap to his estate. On the way they briefly encounter the Moon Stallion, a white horse living wild on the moors, whom Diana is aware of despite her being blind. It transpires that the horse is the mystical messenger of the moon goddess and connected to the story of Merlin.

Diana and Paul, with Estelle the daughter of Sir George, discover that Mortenhurse and Todman seek to capture the horse. Todman, who it turns out is a "horse warlock", desires the power it would offer him as consort to Diana the moon goddess, while the squire blames the horse for his wife's death and seeks revenge.

Cast

 James Greene as Professor Purwell
 Sarah Sutton as Diana Purwell
 David Pullan as Paul Purwell
 John Abineri as Sir George Mortenhurze
 Caroline Goodall as Estelle Mortenhurze (daughter of Sir John)
 David Haig as Todman
 Richard Viner as 'The Dark Rider'
 Michael Kilgarriff as The Green King

Principal locations
 Uffington White Horse
 Wayland's Smithy

References

External links
 
 
 Screencaps and multimedia
Episode guide
Detailed production information and credits

BBC children's television shows
British supernatural television shows
1970s British children's television series
Works by Brian Hayles